The Bad Hersfelder Festspiele is a German theatre festival in Bad Hersfeld, Hesse. The Bad Hersfelder Festspiele have been staged since 1951.

The Festival 
The Bad Hersfeld Festival takes place every year from mid-June to early August in the German town of Bad Hersfeld. It is known as the Salzburg of the North.

Theatrical pieces and musicals are performed on the 1,400 m² stage in the Stiftsruine Bad Hersfeld. There is padded seating for 1636 spectators. The mobile roof above the auditorium of the monastery ruins makes performances in all weather conditions possible — visitors always sit in the dry. Comedy plays are performed on an outdoor stage in the courtyard of the Eichhof Castle.

At the Festival the Hersfeld-Preis and an audience prize are awarded annually. The prize is based on audience ballots taken in three performances of each show. The winner receives a ring donated by local companies, showing the Schwurhand of Charlemagne against the abbey ruins in the background.

Literature 
 Bad Hersfelder Festspiele. In: Rolf Hosfeld: Festivals 2007/2008: Klassik, Oper, Jazz, Tanz, Theater, Film, Literatur, Kunst - Deutschland, Österreich, Schweiz., Helmut Metz Verlag, 2007, P. 261

External links 

 Homepage of the Bad Hersfelder Festspiele
 Homepage of the Opernfestspiele

References 

Theatre festivals in Germany
Tourist attractions in Hesse